Cambodia is a one-party dominant state with the Cambodian People's Party in power. Cambodia's legislature is chosen through a national election. The general election is held every five years in the fourth Sunday of July. The Parliament of Cambodia has two chambers. 
The National Assembly has 125 members, each elected for a five-year term by proportional representation. The Senate has 62 members, mostly indirectly elected.

Since the signing of the 1991 Paris Peace Accords ending decades of civil war and foreign occupation, and with the final elimination in 1998 of armed insurgency groups inside the country, six national elections have taken place in Cambodia in 1993, 1998, 2003, 2008, 2013 and 2018.  The first national elections were administered by United Nations Transitional Authority for Cambodia (UNTAC) in July 1993, the first commune-level election was held in February 2002 and the Cambodian Senate was elected for the first time by the elected commune council officials in January 2006.

Three main political parties have dominated Cambodian politics over the last decade: the Cambodian People's Party (CPP), the United Front for an Independent, Neutral, Peaceful, and Cooperative Cambodia (FUNCINPEC) and, more recently, the Cambodia National Rescue Party (CNRP).  Although the CPP dominated the elections held on July 27, 2003, it did not win the two-thirds majority required under the constitution to form a government on its own.  A new government was formed on July 15, 2004, after protracted negotiations between the CPP and FUNCINPEC on forming a coalition government.

In early 2006 the CPP further consolidated its hold on power by passing an amendment to the constitution through Parliament that will allow for a 50% plus one majority in the National Assembly to form a government (instead of the two-thirds majority), thereby reducing its future reliance on FUNCINPEC or another coalition partner.

Elections (since 1993)

General election

Communal elections

Senate election

See also
 List of political parties in Cambodia
 Electoral calendar
 Electoral system

References

External links
 National Election Committee (NEC)
 Adam Carr's Election Archive
 Cambodia Development Resource Institute (CDRI) - Development policy research institute
 Committee for Free and Fair Elections in Cambodia (COMFREL) - NGO
 Coalition for Free and Fair Elections (COFFEL) - NGO